
Year 213 BC was a year of the pre-Julian Roman calendar. At the time it was known as the Year of the Consulship of Maximus and Gracchus (or, less frequently, year 541 Ab urbe condita). The denomination 213 BC for this year has been used since the early medieval period, when the Anno Domini calendar era became the prevalent method in Europe for naming years.

Events 
 By place 
 Seleucid Empire 
 In alliance with Attalus I of Pergamum, Antiochus III finally captures the rebel king of Anatolia, Achaeus, in his capital, Sardis, after a siege of two years. Antiochus III then has Achaeus executed.

 Roman Republic 
 Casilinum and Arpi are recovered by the Romans from Hannibal.

 Sicily 
 Archimedes's war machines repel the Roman army that is invading Syracuse.

 China 
 Emperor Qin Shi Huang and Prime Minister Li Si order all Confucian writings destroyed in the burning of books and burying of scholars.

Deaths 
 Aratus of Sicyon, Greek statesman, general and advocate of Greek unity, who, for many years, has been the leader of the Achaean League (b. 271 BC)
 Achaeus, Seleucid general and later separatist ruler of most of Anatolia until his defeat and execution by the Seleucid king Antiochus III

References